Swampfest is an annual musical festival that showcases Palmerston North bands. Swampfest was originally timed to coincide with New Zealand Music Month (May), but in 2009 Switched to September to match The Stomach's 21st birthday. Swampfest is known for showcasing up-and-coming as well as established artists, all from the Palmerston North area, and the artists must play original music. The music played is often guitar based and of the Rock genre however punk, ska, electronic, hip hop, metal, pop, solo and acoustic have all featured in the festival.

The festival is named after Palmerston North's primordial origins as a swamp.

Location
Swampfest in 2004 and 2005 were held at The Guv'nors Tavern. Swampfest in 2006 and 2007 was held at The Globe Theatre, Palmerston North. There was no Swampfest in 2008 due to the Stomach building being refurbished. Swampfest 2009 was held at the Stomach. Due to a cut in operating funding, there was no Swampfest in 2010. Swampfest'11 was held at The Stomach, The Regent Theatre, JBHiFi, and alternative venues. Swampfest 2012 was held at The Regent Theatre, The Stomach, The Royal and other locations. Swampfest 2013 was held at The Regent Theatre, The Stomach, The Dark Room and The Square.

Organisation
Creative Sounds and the staff of The Stomach are the main co-ordinators behind the event.

History
Local musician Murray Shaw (Turbostill/Bloodspray for Politics/Neckstretchers/Hellborne/Slave Collective-www.slave.co.nz) came up with the original name and concept (numerous local/original bands playing over multiple nights) for SwampFest. He decided not to pursue it, and two other local musicians, Craig Black and Hayden Sinclair oversaw the first two events.

Swampfest began in 2004 with 8 bands over two nights. This was held at The Guv'nors Tavern. Following the success of the first event, Swampfest'05 featured 12 bands over three nights.

To allow Swampfest to grow and involve more artists (and to take the financial burden off Black and Sinclair), from 2006 the event has been c-ordinated by Creative Sounds/The Stomach. The 2006/7 Swampfests were held at the Globe Theatre to allow for an All Ages audience in keeping with the objectives of Creative Sounds. Due to the complete refurbishment of The Stomach in 2008, staff were unable to co-ordinate a Swampfest that year. 2009 was the 21st year of operation for the Stomach, the birthday celebration was combined with Swampfest. Due to a funding cut, leading to staff redundancy, The Stomach was unable to co-ordinate a Swampfest that year.

With a strong sense of irony, The Stomach is able to relaunch Swampfest in 2011, due to funding gained from the Rugby World Cup regional events fund, administered by the Our People Our Place Trust.

The 2005/6/7 Swampfests were filmed and two songs from each performing band placed on a limited edition DVD.
The four Stomach based show of Swampfest'11, will be webcast live.

Previous to Swampfest, Palmerston North music was celebrated with various incarnations of an annual music events, ranging from The Intergalactic Balls of the early 1990s, and various multimedia events  culminated in the 1997 The Restless Festival of Youth which secured funding to run a variety of local events at different venues. The annual Restless Festival showcasing local talent evolved each year, and became the first live gig at the restored Regent Theatre, 1999's Cerebral Cortex embraced 17 local acts performing on the same night.

Lineups

2004
7.62 Short
Collapse
Faker
Hellborne
Hoopla!
Reflector
Stitchface
Wall Of Silents

2005
The Bing Turkby Ensemble
Black Chrome
Cathedra
Collapse
Dub Arkestra
Hellborne
Hoopla!
Impish
Reflector
Scourge Of Tussin
Stitchface
Velvetine Black
Missing Link

2006
Bing Turkby Ensemble
Black Chrome
Collapse
Emmilies Illusion
Grayson Gilmour
Hellborne
The Livids
Reflector
Stiletto
Stitchface
Twice Daily
Wall Of Silents

2007
Bing Turkby Ensemble
Black Chrome
The B-Side Electro Funk Disaster
Cathedra
Cord Willis
The Godfrees
Hoopla!
Little Room
The Livids
The Particulars
Us As Robots
Wall Of Silents

2009
Massacre the Weak
Ricky Bobby
Joe Hill
Scarkiss
Solfonic
Black Chrome
The Kleptics
The Nerines
National Office
David Stevens
The Excludents
Haluciagea
Nutella Monk
Bing Turkby Ensemble
The Postures
Ruski
Us As Robots

2011
nutellamonk
HUF
researchintospeed
The Drugs
-52
Highfield Weekend
Us As Robots
Fowl Friends
Brooklyn State Hospital
The Bing Turkby Ensemble
Thief
Robin
Cephalopod
Losses
Discorpse
Project Blood
Ricky Bobby
iRyoko
Outside the Beat
Stanley Pedigree
Dirtbox Charlie
Grayson Gilmour
The Nerines
Jemmamarie
Amelia Shadbolt
Te Ra Moriarty

2012
nutellamonk
Busta Dimes
Given Names
researchintospeed
Alpha Beta Gamma
iRyoko
Grysn Glmr
The Methadonnas
Mountain Eater
Pom Pom
-52
The Bing Turkby Ensemble
Black Chrome
The Impediments
Reclusia
Dirtbox Charlie
Amphora
Bloodspray for Politics
Cephalopod
Nausea
Project Blood
Diamond Sutra
BottleKids
Beneath The Heavens
Black Wings
Forsaken
huf
Stanley Pedigree
Abi Symes
Benny Tipene
Hydro Raspberry
Kelsey Lawn
The Nerines
Robin

2013
Abi Symes
Amelia & the Other Stuff
Bridget and Dylan
Sam Morgan
Shayla
Te Ra Moriarty and Tim Jurgens
Benny Tipene
Dick Tracy
The Jefferys
The Nerines
Beneath the Heavens
Carrion
Cats Eat Dogs
Gains
Valerie Solanas
Hot Property
Indecisive
Man in Rug
No Shells
66Queens
Alpha Beta Gamma
Commander Dimes
Given Names
Journey of Chaos
DJ Samir
Rave Dobbyn
Big Friendlies

Notes

External links
SwampFestNZ SwampFest on Facebook
Creative Sounds Society Incorporated - Organiser of the Swampfest festival
Swampfest 2005 - Review by NZ Musician
Swampfest 2004 - Review by NZ Musician
Student City Swampfest Info Page

Culture in Palmerston North
Rock festivals in New Zealand
Recurring events established in 2004
Tourist attractions in Manawatū-Whanganui